Teodosiy Dzhartov (1894 – 14 January 1945) was a Bulgarian activist from Vardar Macedonia.

Dzhartov was a teacher in Kumanovo during the First World War Bulgarian occupation of parts from Kingdom of Serbia incl. Vardar Macedonia. During the Second World War Bulgarian occupation of parts from Kingdom of Yugoslavia in 1941, he participated in the Bulgarian Action Committees and later became a Mayor of Kumanovo. After the War, to wipe out the remaining Bulgarophile sentiments, the new Communist authorities persecuted the local Bulgarian nationalists with the charges of "great-Bulgarian chauvinism". He was executed by Yugoslav Partisans on 14 January 1945 near Kumanovo. Dzhartov was then 50 years old.

See also
Kumanovo
List of mayors of Kumanovo

References

People from Kumanovo
Macedonian Bulgarians
1894 births
1945 deaths
Bulgarian activists
People killed by Yugoslav Partisans